Dunns Creek State Park is a Florida State Park, located approximately 15 miles south of Palatka, on US 17.

History
Native Americans used this site as evidenced by the fairly widespread shell mounds.  During the 1920s, a steamboat stop provided wood and water to citrus loaded ships.  The area was also used as a post office for the towns of Pomona and Sisco.  The 6,000-acre property was the site of turpentining, logging, cattle ranching and farming operations within the last century.  Located south of a sharp bend in the St. Johns River along Dunns Creek (which connects to Crescent Lake), the park was added to the state park system in October 2001.

Notes

External links
Dunns Creek at Florida State Parks
Dunns Creek at State Parks
Dunns Creek at Wildernet
Dunns Creek State Park Unit Management Plan

State parks of Florida
Parks in Putnam County, Florida
2001 establishments in Florida